Badakənd or Badakend may refer to:
Badakənd (40° 48' N 45° 45' E), village in the Shamkir Rayon of Azerbaijan
Ələsgərli, Shamkir, village in the Shamkir Rayon of Azerbaijan